Medical Police is an American  comedy streaming television series, created by Rob Corddry, Krister Johnson, Jonathan Stern and David Wain, that premiered on Netflix on January 10, 2020. It is a spin-off of the short-form alt-comedy series Childrens Hospital, that parodied medical dramas, whereas Medical Police is a parody of international spy thrillers. The series stars Erinn Hayes and Rob Huebel as Childrens Hospital doctors Lola Spratt and Owen Maestro. When they discover a world-threatening virus, they are recruited as government agents in a globe-spanning race to find a cure. In the process, they unmask a deep conspiracy amidst the outbreak. Released during the early months of the COVID-19 pandemic, the series' depiction of a global disease outbreak has been described as "inadvertently timely."

Cast

Main
 Erinn Hayes as Dr. Lola Spratt
 Rob Huebel as Dr. Owen Maestro

Recurring/Notable guest stars

 Malin Åkerman as Valerie Flame
 Sarayu Rao as Sloane McIntyre
 Rob Corddry as Blake Downs
 Tom Wright as Director Patten
 Lake Bell as Cat Black
 Jason Schwartzman as The Goldfinch
 Fred Melamed as Professor Waters
 Michael Cera as Sal Viscuso (voice only)
 Henry Winkler as Sy Mittleman
 Craig Robinson as Edgar Tooby
 Megan Le as Agent Tran
 Ken Marino as Glenn Richie
 Eric Nenninger as Collins
 Randall Park as Clavis Kim
 Lilly Singh as Baroness Von Eaglesburg

Episodes

Production 
After Childrens Hospital ended in 2016, in 2017 series creator Rob Corddry revealed that a spin-off series was in development, describing the new show as a "global thriller" with a season-long serial narrative that shifts across countries, unlike Childrens Hospital which eschewed strict continuity, and was set primarily in Brazil. On February 19, 2019, Netflix announced that it had given the production a series order for a first season consisting of ten half-hour episodes. The series was co-created by Rob Corddry, Jonathan Stern, David Wain, and Krister Johnson, who also serve as executive producers and writers. The show is produced by Warner Horizon Scripted TV, which has an overall deal with producer Jonathan Stern.

Release 
On December 16, 2019, Netflix announced that Medical Police would premiere on its streaming service globally on January 10, 2020. On December 19, 2019, a trailer for the series was released.

Reception
On the review aggregator website Rotten Tomatoes, the first season has a 92% approval rating with an average rating of 7.12/10, based on 13 reviews. The website's critical consensus reads, "Cop-doctors finally get their due in Medical Police, a show that works almost as well as a good old fashioned action-adventure as it does a delightfully absurd satire about doctor-cops." On Metacritic, the first season has a weighted average score of 62 out of 100, based on 6 critics, indicating "generally favorable reviews".

References

External links
 
 

2020 American television series debuts
2020 American television series endings
2020s American workplace comedy television series
2020s American medical television series
American comedy web series
English-language Netflix original programming
American thriller television series
Television series by Warner Horizon Television
American television spin-offs
American spy comedy television series